Stettbach is a railway station on the north-eastern boundary of the Swiss city of Zürich. Although the station is located just within the city boundary, in the city's Schwamendingen district, it takes its name from the nearby village of Stettbach, which is in the adjacent municipality of Dübendorf.

History 
Stettbach station, along with the Zürichberg Tunnel and the connecting railway on which the station is situated, were opened in 1990. At the same time Zürich Stadelhofen station was connected by the Hirschengraben Tunnel to new through low level platforms at Zürich Hauptbahnhof, thus creating the through west-east backbone of the Zürich S-Bahn. In conjunction with the opening of the Glattalbahn in 2010, the tram and bus station on the surface were rebuilt.

Operation 
The station is on the Zürichberg line, which links Zürich Stadelhofen station, in central Zürich, with Dietlikon and Dübendorf stations. The station has a single platform below ground level, served by two tracks, and at the southern end of the station the railway tracks enter the  Zürichberg Tunnel to Zürich Stadelhofen.

The station is served by the following lines of the Zürich S-Bahn:
 
 
 
 

All lines are operated by the Swiss Federal Railways (SBB). During weekends, there are also four nighttime S-Bahn service (SN1, SN5, SN6, SN9) offered by ZVV.

 Nighttime S-Bahn (only during weekends):

Adjacent to the station at ground-level are the termini of two of Zurich's tram routes. Route 7 is owned and operated by the Verkehrsbetriebe Zürich (VBZ) and links Stettbach to central Zürich via the Schwamendingen district. Several bus routes also depart from the ground-level station.

Future plans 

Gallery

References

External links 

Railway stations in Zürich